Gauradaha is a municipality in Jhapa District in the Province No. 1 of eastern Nepal. After the government announcement the municipality was established on 19 September 2015 by merging the existing Maharanijhoda, Baigundhura, Juropani, Kohabara and Gauradaha village development committees (VDCs). The center of the municipality is established in the mid of Gauradaha, Dhobiniya chowk. At the time of the 2011 Nepal census after merging the four VDCs population it had a total population of 47,393 persons. After the government decision the number of municipalities has reached 217 in Nepal.

References

Populated places in Jhapa District
Municipalities in Koshi Province
Nepal municipalities established in 2015
Municipalities in Jhapa District